Tuchah-e Alman (also Romanized as Tūchāh-e Ālmān; also known as Too Chah, Toucha, Tūchā’, and Tūchāh) is a village in Jirhandeh-ye Lasht-e Nesha Rural District, Lasht-e Nesha District, Rasht County, Gilan Province, Iran. At the 2006 census, its population was 503, in 137 families.

References 

Populated places in Rasht County